Charles Franklin Davis (born November 14, 1964) is an American football analyst. He is currently an analyst for NFL on CBS, working alongside Ian Eagle. He is also an analyst for Tennessee Titans preseason games, working alongside Dan Hellie. Along with Brandon Gaudin, he is the analyst for the Madden NFL series since 2017.  He is also an analyst for the NFL Network, and has previously worked with Fox Sports, TBS, ESPN, The Golf Channel and Sun Sports (now Bally Sports Sun).

Davis was a safety for the Tennessee Volunteers from 1982 to 1986, though he went undrafted in the 1987 NFL Draft. He earned a master's degree in history while a student at Tennessee. He resides in Windermere, Florida, with his wife Lisa, a University of Tennessee law school graduate. He has a son, Parker, who played  basketball at Rollins College, and is now in graduate school at Georgetown, and a daughter Taylor, who founded the clrlosangeles.com candle brand.

Early years
Davis was born in Elizabethton, Tennessee, but he and his family moved to New Paltz, New York, when he was two years old. His father, Franklin, was a high school football and basketball coach.  Davis played football, basketball and baseball at New Paltz High School. Davis played quarterback, defensive back, and kicker for the high school football team.

A dual-threat quarterback, during his senior year he passed for 742 yards and six touchdowns, and he ran for 738 yards and eleven touchdowns. He also registered four interceptions on defense, and completed 15 of 20 extra points and a field goal as a kicker. He earned All-State honors his junior and senior seasons.

College career

1983 season

Davis accepted a football scholarship from the University of Tennessee, in part because it was the school where one of his childhood heroes, Condredge Holloway, had played.  After redshirting during his first season in 1982, he was moved from quarterback to free safety and worked his way into the starting lineup during the 1983 season. He had interceptions against Pittsburgh and LSU early in the year, and a key interception that helped preserve Tennessee's 7–0 win against Rutgers. He registered 12 tackles in the Vols' 41–34 win over Alabama, and had 5 tackles and recovered a fumble in the team's loss to Auburn. He finished the season with 58 tackles (39 solo) and a team-leading 4 interceptions.

1984 season

During Tennessee's win over Washington State at the start of the 1984 season, Davis suffered a broken fibula.  Although he played through the pain and finished the game, he missed the next three games.  He tallied 8 tackles in Tennessee's 28–27 win over Alabama, and had interceptions late in the season against Kentucky and Vanderbilt.  He finished the season with 34 tackles (22 solo), 4 passes defensed, and 2 interceptions.

1985 season

Davis was named to the Preseason All-SEC team at the beginning of Tennessee's memorable 1985 season.  For the year, he registered 59 tackles (33 solo), forced 2 fumbles, and 2 passes defensed.  In Tennessee's 35–7 win over Miami in the 1986 Sugar Bowl, Davis had 6 tackles and an interception.

1986 season

Davis was again named to the Preseason All-SEC team for the 1986 season.  In the third quarter of a close game against New Mexico, he intercepted a pass and returned it 55 yards for a touchdown. He finished the year with 83 tackles (52 solo) and 4 interceptions. He was named to the SEC Academic Honor Roll at the end of the season.

Davis graduated with a degree in political science prior to his senior year with the Tennessee football team, and subsequently earned a master's degree in history.

Broadcasting career
Davis was signed as an undrafted free agent by the Dallas Cowboys after the 1987 NFL Draft on April 30. He was waived on August 6.

After not making the team, he enrolled in graduate school. One of the first games he called was the University of Tennessee's 1987 Orange-and-White Game (an annual scrimmage played at the end of spring practice), in which he worked alongside long-time Vol Network play-by-play commentator John Ward.

Davis' initial career path took him into a variety of jobs related to sports. He was an assistant coach at the University of the Pacific for one season (1989), worked for the Southeastern Conference and was hired as the director of the United States Olympic Training Center.  He was an assistant athletic director at Stanford University for three years, 1994-1996.  In 1996, Davis became manager of sports operations on multipurpose fields and sports programming at the field house at Disney's Wide World of Sports. In October 1998, Davis became the first African-American to be a tournament director of a PGA Tour golf event, when he led the Walt Disney World Golf Classic.

In 1997, Fox Sports South hired him to serve as an analyst on college football games. Davis also worked at radio station 740 The Team in Orlando, Florida, co-hosting Clarke and Davis, a morning show, along with local sportscaster Pat Clarke (along with various special guests including "The Pastor" Sean Fitzgerald, Glenn Dehmer and Steve Gunter) from July 2000 until July 2002.  During this same period, he worked as a sideline reporter during Jefferson Pilot's SEC Game of the Week, and co-hosted the Sunshine Network's evening sports show, Sunshine Network Live. He called Arena Football League games for the AFL on NBC from 2003 to 2004.  In basketball, Davis worked as a sideline reporter for CBS's coverage of the 2001 and 2002 NCAA Men's Tournaments. Davis has also worked as a Sideline Reporter for the NBA Playoffs on TNT. He has also been a frequent commentator on The Golf Channel, appearing on program's such as Viewer's Forum and the Grey Goose 19th Hole.

Davis joined Fox Sports as an analyst in 2006. He called the 2007 BCS National Championship Game with Barry Alvarez and Thom Brennaman, and the 2008 and 2009 games with only Brennaman. He and Brennaman also called Appalachian State's upset of Michigan in 2007 on the Big Ten Network.

Davis was featured within NFL Network’s exclusive coverage of the Senior Bowl and NFL Scouting Combine. He was also an analyst on Path to the Draft, which provides in-depth analysis on prospective draft choices and a look at each NFL team's needs during the off-season with host Paul Burmeister and Mike Mayock.  From 2007 to 2009, Davis was an analyst on NFL Network's College Football Now, a show that brought fans a daily dose of college football highlights, news and analysis. In addition to his duties in studio at NFL Network, Davis also served as a game analyst for the network's broadcasts of the 2007 Texas Bowl. From 2007 to 2008, he served as an analyst for the Tampa Bay Buccaneers preseason schedule.

Davis joined the NFL on Fox postgame show in October 2008, appearing with Jimmy Johnson and Terry Bradshaw. He appeared with Chris Rose, Barry Switzer, and Johnson on December 7, 2008 for the BCS results shows.  For the 2013 NFL season, Fox paired Davis with Gus Johnson on regional telecasts.  He also called Atlanta Falcons preseason games with Tim Brant and previously, Vince Cellini.

In 2014, Davis joined Bob Papa to provide game commentary at Super Bowl XLVIII for NFL Films' World Feed. In 2015, Davis returned to Fox to join Thom Brennaman and Tony Siragusa to focus full-time on NFL broadcasts.

In 2016, Davis alongside Brandon Gaudin (who also calls Big Ten college football as well as select NFL games) became the new commentators for the Madden NFL video game franchise, debuting in Madden NFL 17 replacing Phil Simms and Jim Nantz. The two continued as commentators for Madden NFL 18, Madden NFL 19, Madden NFL 20, Madden NFL 21 and Madden NFL 22 .

Starting in the 2017 NFL season, Davis became part of Fox's number 2 team with Kevin Burkhardt and Pam Oliver.

In 2020 Davis moved to CBS to replace Dan Fouts as the network’s number 2 game analyst.

References

External links
Official website

Living people
1964 births
American football safeties
Players of American football from Tennessee
Tennessee Volunteers football players
American television sports announcers
National Basketball Association broadcasters
National Football League announcers
American television reporters and correspondents
African-American sports announcers
African-American sports journalists
College football announcers
Arena football announcers
Golf writers and broadcasters
College basketball announcers in the United States
People from Elizabethton, Tennessee
People from Windermere, Florida
People from New Paltz, New York
21st-century American journalists
21st-century African-American people
20th-century African-American people